Morphett may refer to:

Surname
Drew Morphett (1948–2017), Australian sports broadcaster
John Morphett (1809–1892), pioneer and parliamentarian in South Australia
George Morphett (1811–1893), his brother, also a parliamentarian in South Australia
George Cummins Morphett (1876–1963), grandson of John Morphett, businessman and parliamentarian in South Australia
John Morphett (architect) (1932–2016), Australian architect
Tony Morphett (1938–2018), Australian film and television script writer
Scott Morphett (born 1965), Australian rules football player

Named after Sir John Morphett
Electoral district of Morphett, South Australia House of Assembly
Morphett Street, Adelaide, Australia
Morphett Vale, South Australia, a suburb of Adelaide
Morphett Vale railway station
Morphett Vale Football Club
Morphettville, South Australia, a suburb of Adelaide

Other uses
Morphett Street Brewery, Adelaide, Australia

See also
Morphett families of South Australia